Xed is a lightweight text editor forked from Pluma and is the default text editor in Linux Mint.

Xed is a graphical application which supports editing multiple text files in one window via tabs. It fully supports international text through its use of the Unicode UTF-8 encoding. As a general-purpose text editor, Xed supports most standard editor features, and emphasizes simplicity and ease of use. Its core feature set includes syntax highlighting of source code, auto indentation, and printing support with print preview.

Features
 Optional vertical tab list in side pane
 Complete support for UTF-8 text
 Auto indentation and configurable indentation values
 Document statistics of file and within selection (line counter, word counter, character count with and without spaces, byte count)
 View CVS changelogs
 Colored syntax highlighting
 Remote file editing
 Smart find and replace
 Print preview and printing
 File comparison
 File history
 Complete preferences interface
 Support for plugin customization
 Optional Python support
 Prebundled plugins including a spell checker, case transform, file browser, sort, and insert date/time
 Edit multiple files in one window using tab
 Indicate how long ago the file was last saved when closing an unsaved document.

See also 

 Kate – KDE default text editor

References

External links
 

Free software programmed in C
Free software programmed in Python
Free text editors
Linux text editors
Notepad replacements
Software using the GPL license
Text editors that use GTK
Unix text editors